Antakotako is a town and commune in Madagascar. It belongs to the district of Maroantsetra, which is a part of Analanjirofo Region. The population of the commune was estimated to be approximately 11,000 in 2001 commune census.

Only primary schooling is available. The majority 95% of the population of the commune are farmers.  The most important crops are rice and cloves, while other important agricultural products are coffee and vanilla.  Services provide employment for 5% of the population.

References and notes 

Populated places in Analanjirofo